Eleazar García Sáenz (September 28, 1924 – August 24, 1999) was a Mexican character actor best remembered as Antonio Aguilar's comic sidekick. Eleazar originally is from a ranch called, El Rancho de Los Guerras, current municipality of Miguel Aleman near Mier, Tamaulipas Mexico. García was known professionally as Chelelo and was one of the three main norteño comedians of Mexican cinema, along with Eulalio González and Alejandro Reyna.

He died on 24 August 1999 after three years of struggle to recover from embolism. His son Eleazar Lorenzo García Gutiérrez (1957-2011) was known as Chelelo Jr.

Selected filmography
El revólver sangriento (1964)
Viento negro (1965)
Juan Pistolas (1966)
Lauro Puñales (1969)
El ojo de vidrio (1969)
Vuelve el ojo de vidrio (1970)
Valente Quintero (1973)
  Nobleza Ranchera (1974)
  Contrabando y Traicion (alternative title, Camelia la Texana) 1977
El miedo no anda en burro (1976)
El rey de oro (1982)
  El Traficante (1983)
  El Vengador del 30-06 (1983)
  Todos Eran Valientes (1983)
  Los Peseros  (1984)
  El Traficante 2 (1984)
  La Muerte Cruzó el Río Bravo (1984)
 La Cárcel De Laredo (1985)

References

External links

Mexican male film actors
Mexican male comedians
1924 births
1999 deaths
20th-century Mexican male actors
20th-century comedians
Male actors from Tamaulipas